Guamal is a town and municipality in the Meta Department, Colombia.

Climate
Guamal has a tropical rainforest climate (Köppen Af). The climate is hot and sometimes humid, though its proximity to the foothills of the Oriental Andes brings mild breezes at nightfall.

References

Municipalities of Meta Department